In mathematics, particularly linear algebra, a zero matrix or null matrix is a matrix all of whose entries are zero. It also serves as the additive identity of the additive group of  matrices, and is denoted by the symbol  or  followed by subscripts corresponding to the dimension of the matrix as the context sees fit. Some examples of zero matrices are

Properties

The set of  matrices with entries in a ring K forms a ring .

That is, for all  it satisfies the equation

There is exactly one zero matrix of any given dimension m×n (with entries from a given ring), so when the context is clear, one often refers to the zero matrix.  In general, the zero element of a ring is unique, and is typically denoted by 0 without any subscript indicating the parent ring.  Hence the examples above represent zero matrices over any ring.

The zero matrix also represents the linear transformation which sends all the vectors to the zero vector. It is idempotent, meaning that when it is multiplied by itself, the result is itself.

The zero matrix is the only matrix whose rank is 0.

Occurrences

The mortal matrix problem is the problem of determining, given a finite set of n × n matrices with integer entries, whether they can be multiplied in some order, possibly with repetition, to yield the zero matrix. This is known to be undecidable for a set of six or more 3 × 3 matrices, or a set of two 15 × 15 matrices.

In ordinary least squares regression, if there is a perfect fit to the data, the annihilator matrix is the zero matrix.

See also
Identity matrix, the multiplicative identity for matrices
Matrix of ones, a matrix where all elements are one
Nilpotent matrix
Single-entry matrix, a matrix where all but one element is zero

References

Matrices
0 (number)
Sparse matrices